Lisa Marie Wiegand,  (born October 20, 1968) is an American cinematographer.

Biography
Lisa Marie Wiegand was born in 1968 in Royal Oak, Michigan, USA. She graduated in 1989 from Wayne State University, and obtained her MFA in cinematography from UCLA in 1998. In 1995, she received a Master's in Cinematography from the American Film Institute AFI.

In 1997, she attended the Színház-es Filmmûvészeti Foiskola (Academy of Drama and Film, Faculty of Film and Television) in Budapest, Hungary, and UCLA in 1998.

Wiegand started in taking stills and developing them in her father's darkroom as a child. She switched to motion capture when she started shooting local cable TV ads. She went on to direct multi-camera shoots on commercials and industrial films while working at Detroit's Midwest Video.

"Wiegand has been featured, several times, in American Cinematographer Magazine and has been awarded for 'Excellence in Cinematography' by the American Society of Cinematographers."

Wiegand taught cinematography at The American Film Institute, UCLA, and Loyola Marymount University for several years. She also volunteers her skills to the Sundance Institute's Filmmaker's Labs.

2010 she worked on Dollhouse (film), The Assignment, and Mayfly.

Awards
1998 won the ASC Karl Struss Heritage Award at the American Society of Cinematographers, USA
1999 won the ASC UCLA FF Award at the American Society of Cinematographers, USA for Jornada del Muerto.

Filmography

Notes

References

External links

 Lisa Wiegand website.
 "DP Lisa Wiegand Speaks to WIFC", Women in Film Chicago, September 27, 2012.

1969 births
People from Royal Oak, Michigan
Wayne State University alumni
University of California faculty
Loyola Marymount University faculty
American cinematographers
Living people
American women cinematographers
American women academics
21st-century American women